Bojan Polak-Stjenka (28 November 1918 – 4 July 2004) was a Yugoslav military officer, Communist politician, and athlete of Slovene ethnicity.

Biography
Polak was born in Ormož on 28 November 1918, shortly after the end of the First World War. He was raised in Žiri and Ljubljana and showed considerable prowess in athletics, becoming the Yugoslav national champion in decathlon in 1938. He attended the military academy for reserve officers of the Royal Yugoslav Army in Sarajevo and graduated in 1940. Following the defeat of the Royal Army in the April War, he joined the Yugoslav Partisans and by 1943 was made Commander of the Ljubo Sercer Shock Brigade. In 1946, Polak was sent to the Soviet Artillery Academy in Moscow, where he remained for two years. In 1953, he retired from military service.

After his retirement from the military, Polak became involved in politics and veterans advocacy. He was appointed the Yugoslav Ambassador to the German Democratic Republic in 1964, a post he held until 1968. In 1969, he was made Commander of the Defense Staff of the Territorial Defense of the Socialist Republic of Slovenia. When Marshal Tito died, Polak was one of the guards of honor at his funeral. He was President of the Federation of Veterans Associations of the People's Liberation War from 1983 to 1984 and in 1988, Polak was made President of the ZZB NOV Slovenije, which remains the largest organization for veterans of the Liberation War in Slovenia.

He died in Ljubljana on 4 July 2004.

References

1918 births
2004 deaths
Yugoslav politicians
Yugoslav Partisans members
League of Communists of Slovenia politicians
Recipients of the Order of the People's Hero
Yugoslav decathletes